Hossein Alizadeh is an Iranian musician, composer, radif-preserver, researcher, teacher, and tar, shurangiz and setar instrumentalist and improviser. He has performed with such musicians as Shahram Nazeri, Mohammad-Reza Shajarian, Alireza Eftekhari and Jivan Gasparyan, as well as with a number of orchestras and ensembles.

Music career
Alizadeh was born in 1951 in Tehran. His father was from Urmia and his mother from Arak. As a teenager he attended secondary school at a music conservatory until 1975. His music studies continued at the University of Tehran, where his focus was composition and performance. He began postgraduate studies at the Tehran University of Art. After the Iranian Revolution, he resumed his studies at the University of Berlin, where he studied composition and musicology.

Alizadeh plays the tar and setar. He has performed with two of Iran's national orchestras, as well as with the Aref Ensemble, the Shayda Ensemble, and Masters of Persian Music. In Europe, his first professional performance was with the Bejart Ballet Company’s orchestra in a performance of a Maurice Béjart ballet called Golestan.

Awards
He has been nominated for the 2007 Grammy Award along with Armenian musician, Djivan Gasparyan, for their collaboration album, The Endless Vision.
In 2008, he was voted as "Iran's most distinguished musician of the year".

In November 28, 2014 he refused to accept France’s high distinction in art, Legion of Honour.

Inventions
 Dad o Bidad: A new maqam in Persian music, through combining the gusheh of dad in dastgah of Mahour and the gusheh of bidad in dastgah of Homayoun.
 Sallaneh and Shoor-Angiz: Two new musical instruments derived from the ancient Persian lute barbat.

Works

2020 – Evanesce, with Hamavayan Ensemble
2014 – Eşqim Gəl, with Hamavayan Ensemble (Azerbaijani language)
2010 – Birthplace of Earth, with Hamavayan Ensemble, Ba Music Records. 
2009 – Half Moon, Ba Music Records.
2009 – Echoes of Light with Madjid Khaladj, Ba Music Records.
2007 – Ode To Flowers, with Hamavayan Ensemble, Ba Music Records.
2006 – Endless Vision, with Djivan Gasparyan
2005 – Birds, with Madjid Khaladj and Homa Niknam, Ba Music Records.
2005 – Faryad (The Cry),with MR Shajaian, Keyhan Kalhor and H Shajarian, World Village Music
2003 – Sallaneh, Mahoor Institute
2002 – Bi To Be Sar Nemishavad (Without You), MR Shajarian,Keyhan Kalhor and Homayoun Shajarian, World Village Music
2001 – Chahargah & Bayat-e Tork with Hossein Omumi, M Ghavihelm, Mahoor Institute
2000 – Zemestan ast (It's Winter), Mehdi Akhavan Sales: Poems MR Shajaian: Vocals Hossein Alizadeh: Tar Keyhan Kalhor: Kamancheh H Shajarian: Vocals & tombak Soroush Co.
1999 – Raz-e No (Novel Mystery), Hossein Alizadeh: Composer, Tar, Tanbur Mohsen Keramati, Afsaneh Rasayi, Homa Niknam, Ali Samadpour: Vocals Daryush Zargari: Tombak Mahoor Institute
 Paria, Qesseh-ye Dokhtara-ye Nane Darya (Paria, Tale of Daughters of the Mother Sea)
1996 – Sobhgahi Hossein Alizadeh: Composer Mohsen Karamati: Vocals Mahoor Institute
1995 – Musique iranienne : improvisations (کنسرت بداهه نوازی : نوا و همایون ) : H. Alizadeh : tar & setar ; Madjid Khaladj : tombak, Buda Records 
1994  Paykubi Hossein Alizadeh: Setar Daryush Zargari: Tombak Mahoor Institute
1993 – Hamnavaei Hossein Alizadeh: Tar Arshad Tahmasbi: Tar Dariush Zargari: Tombak Mahoor Institute
1991 – Ava-ye Mehr (Song of Campassion), Hossein Alizadeh: Composer Orchestra of Indigenous Instruments of Iran
1990 – No Bang-e Kohan (Ancient Call-Anew) Mahoor Institute
1988 – Shourangiz (Song of Campassion), Hossein Alizadeh : Composer Sheyda and Aref Groups Shahram Nazeri: Vocals Mahoor Institute
1989 – Torkaman, Hossein Alizadeh: Setar Mahoor Institute
1988 – Raz-o-Niaz, Hossein Alizadeh: Composer Sheyda and Aref Groups Alireza Eftekhari: Vocals Mahoor Institute
1986 –Dream
1983 – NeyNava, Hossein Alizadeh: Composer String Orchestra of the National Radio and Television of Iran Djamshid Andalibi: Ney Soloist
1983 – Osyan (Revolt)
1977 – Hesar
1977 – Savaran-e Dasht-e Omid (Riders of the Plain of Hope)

Film scores
Taboo, 2015
The Song of Sparrows, 2008.
Half Moon, 2006.
Turtles can fly, 2004.
Abjad ("First Letter"), 2003, composed by Abolfazl Jalili.
Zamani baraye masti asbha ("A Time for Drunken Horses"), 2000.
Doxtaran e xorshid ('Daughters of the Sun") directed by Maryam Shahriya, 2000.
Gabbeh, 1995.
Del Shodegan directed by Ali Hatami, 1992.
Az A'sar, ("From Eons Ago")

References

Laudan Nooshin, in The New Grove Dictionary of Music and Musicians, edited by Stanley Sadie, second edition (Macmillan, London, 2001). . (Oxford University Press, 2001). .

External links

Official Website
A BBC Persian interview with Hossein Alizadeh (in Farsi)
Hossein Alizadeh at Iran Chamber Society
Hossein Alizadeh at Iranian.com
Hossein Alizadeh at Setar.info
Hossein Alizadeh: National Geographic World Music

1951 births
Living people
People from Tehran
Iranian tar players
Iranian musicologists
Iranian setar players
Persian-language singers
Légion d'honneur refusals
Crystal Simorgh recipients
Iranian classical composers
Persian classical musicians
University of Tehran alumni
Iranian film score composers
Azerbaijani-language singers
Islamic Azad University alumni
Berlin University of the Arts alumni